The North Wales Society of Architects (NWSA; ; formerly the North Wales Architectural Society) is one of four branches of the Royal Society of Architects in Wales (RSAW). It was established in 1928 as an independent organisation, becoming a branch of the newly formed Society of Architects in Wales (as the RSAW was initially styled) in 1970 upon the restructuring of the Royal Institute of British Architects (RIBA).

The Society champions better buildings, communities and the environment through architecture and its members. As of 2014 it represented over 120 chartered architects in the region.

The RSAW is the Wales region of the RIBA. RSAW was granted Royal status by the Privy Council in 1994. The society are also members of the Architects Benevolent Society and provide advice for members in the North Wales area.

Events & publications

The Society is noted as being a particularly active branch of the RIBA and organises an annual series of well-attended building visits and lectures, usually held from early autumn through to late spring. In line with NWSA's ethos of promoting architecture to a wider audience, these events are open to non-members and all with an interest in design and architecture.

Visits have included the 2014 Stirling Prize-winning Everyman Theatre, Liverpool, Copper Kingdom, Amlwch, recipient of the RSAW Building of the Year 2014 and Cefn Castell, Criccieth, RSAW Small Project of the Year, 2015.

The society has previously jointly produced the journal, Architecture Wales, with their South Wales counterpart, and as the Chester & North Wales Architectural Society.

Governance

The Society is governed by its elected Council. Councillors are elected for a three-year term at the Society's Annual General Meetings and can serve a maximum of two consecutive terms. Council meets every two months and is led by the Society's President, who serves a maximum two-year term. There is no maximum term for the Society's Honorary Secretary and Honorary Treasurer offices.

Design Consultation
NWSA offers a design review panel to provide impartial expert advice on the quality of designs submitted to local authority Planning Departments across North Wales.

Regalia
 
The Society's Presidential Chain of Office was designed in 1954 by Fattorini and Sons of Birmingham of hallmarked sterling silver finished in polished hard gold plate and vitreous enamelled in three colours. Between 1961 and 1994 the Society presented a Past President Medal, similarly designed and produced by Fattorini. This custom was reinstated in 2017.

Presidents
As of October 2022, the Society has been served by 45 presidents in its 94-year history, amongst them many celebrated luminaries of the profession. Whilst there are inconsistencies in the years in office quoted below, due to Annual General Meetings being held at various times throughout the year, with the exception of the Second World War Presidents have served a fixed two-year term. For consistency and in the interests of historical accuracy, the dates shown are therefore taken directly from the Chain of Office.

Honorary Secretaries

This list is incomplete; you can help by expanding it.
G. Parry Davies ?-1964
Kenneth W. Favell 1965-? 
Keith Harwood 1985-?
Ian T Thomas 1997
Mark E French ?   – 2014
Leonie Wainwright 2014 – 2016
Derwyn Owen 2016 – 2018
Gethin Jones 2018 – 2022
Leonie Wainwright 2022 – (acting Secretary)

Honorary Treasurers

This list is incomplete; you can help by expanding it.
 R John Howard 1978
 W D (`Gwilym') Evans 1984
 C P (`Skip') Belton 1994
 J Barrie M Williams 1997 – 2011
 Andrew Kelly 2011 –

References

Architecture organisations based in the United Kingdom
Professional associations based in the United Kingdom
Professional associations based in Wales
Architecture-related professional associations
Architecture in Wales
Welsh design
1928 establishments in Wales